Municipal elections were held in Finland on 9 April 2017 with advance voting between 29 March and 4 April. The councils in 295 municipalities in Finland (excluding Åland) were elected. Several municipalities altered the size of their councils (mainly because of municipal mergers) before the elections which resulted in reduction of seats available from 9,674 to 8,999.

Opinion polls
Poll results are listed in the table below in reverse chronological order, showing the most recent first. The highest percentage figure in each poll is displayed in bold, and the background shaded in the leading party's colour. In the instance that there is a tie, then no figure is shaded. The table uses the date the survey's fieldwork was done, as opposed to the date of publication. However, if that date is unknown, the date of publication will be given instead. List includes only polls that were made for the municipal election.

Results

|-
! style="text-align:center;" colspan=3 |Party
! style="text-align:center;" |Votes
! style="text-align:right;" |%
! style="text-align:right;" |+/–
! style="text-align:right;" |Seats
! style="text-align:right;" |+/–
|-
|style="background:;"| ||style="text-align:left;"|National Coalition ||  || 531,599 || 20.7 || –1.2 || 1,490 || –245
|-
|style="background:;"| ||style="text-align:left;"|Social Democratic Party ||  || 498,252 || 19.4 || –0.2 || 1,697 || –32
|-
|style="background:;"| ||style="text-align:left;"|Centre Party ||  || 450,529  || 17.5 || –1.1 || 2,824 || –253
|-
|style="background:;"| ||style="text-align:left;"|Green League ||  || 320,235 || 12.5 || +3.9 || 534 || +211
|-
|style="background:;"| ||style="text-align:left;"|Finns Party ||  || 227,297 || 8.8 || –3.5 || 770 || –425
|-
|style="background:;"| ||style="text-align:left;"|Left Alliance ||  || 226,626 || 8.8 || +0.8 || 658 || +18
|-
|style="background:;"| ||style="text-align:left;"|Swedish People's Party ||  || 125,518 || 4.9 || +0.2 || 471 || –9
|-
|style="background:;"| ||style="text-align:left;"|Christian Democrats ||  || 105,551 || 4.1 || +0.4 || 316 || +16
|-
|style="background:;"| ||style="text-align:left;"|Pirate Party ||  || 9,119 || 0.4 || +0.1 || 2 || +2
|-
|style="background:;"| ||style="text-align:left;"|Communist Party ||  || 7,600 || 0.3 || –0.2 || 2 || –7
|-
|style="background:;"| ||style="text-align:left;"|Feminist Party ||  || 6,856 || 0.3 || New || 1 || New
|-
|style="background:;"| ||style="text-align:left;"|Liberal Party ||  || 4,117 || 0.2 || New || 5 || New
|-
|style="background:;"| ||style="text-align:left;"|Independence Party ||  || 1,846 || 0.1 || ±0.0 || 2 || +2
|-
|style="background:;"| ||style="text-align:left;"|Animal Justice Party ||  || 1,795 || 0.1 || New || 0 || New
|-
|style="background:;"| ||style="text-align:left;"|Communist Workers' Party ||  || 702 || 0.1 || ±0.0 || 0 || ±0
|-
| style="text-align:left;" colspan=3 |Total valid votes|| 2,570,768 ||100||–||8,999||–675
|-
| style="text-align:left;" colspan=3 |Invalid votes|| 14,442 || 0.6 || || ||
|-
| style="text-align:left;" colspan=3 |Total|| 2,585,210 || 100 || || ||
|-
| style="text-align:left;" colspan=3 |Registered voters & turnout|| 4,391,558 || 58.9 || +0.6 || ||
|-
| style="text-align:left;" colspan=8 |Source: Yle
|}

Notes

References
 Official results

2017 elections in Finland
April 2017 events in Europe
Municipal elections in Finland